Sanjeevan is a 2022 Indian Tamil-language drama film directed by Mani Shekar and starring Vinod Loghydaas, Dhivya Duraisamy, and Sathya NJ. It was released on 14 October 2022.

Cast
Vinod Loghydaas as Nilan
Dhivya Duraisamy
Sathya NJ
Shiva Nishanth
Vimal Raja
Yazeen
Hema Srikanth

Production
During production, the film was promoted as South India's first snooker based film.

Reception
The film was released on 14 October 2022 across Tamil Nadu. A critic from Dinamalar gave the film a mixed review, noting that it was "partly good". A reviewer from Maalai Malar gave the film a positive review, adding that it was "interesting". A reviewer from Dina Thanthi also praised the film.

References

2022 films
2020s Tamil-language films
Indian sports drama films
Cue sports films
Snooker films